Fereej Al Murra is a district in Qatar, located in the municipality of Al Rayyan.

In the 2015 census, it was listed as a district of zone no. 55 which has a population of 283,675 and also includes Bu Sidra, Al Aziziya, Al Waab, Fereej Al Soudan, Muaither, Al Mearad, New Fereej Al Ghanim, Fereej Al Manaseer and Al Sailiya. 

It borders Bu Sidra to the west, the Doha Industrial Area to the south, Ain Khaled to the east and south-east, New Fereej Al Ghanim to the east, and Al Aziziya to the north.

References

Populated places in Al Rayyan